George Savin De Chaneet was a Hungarian-Australian composer, conductor, choir master, organist and music teacher. He was born in Hamburg, only son of Frederich de Chanéet. He arrived in Melbourne on 22 April 1884, where he spent his active life, seeking naturalisation in 1899.

He dedicated much of his time to St Mary's Roman Catholic Church in West Melbourne, and composed church music for other parishes and denominations.

Works
 Hungarian dance
 Mass for worship
 In the Cathedral (a Christmas song)
 The children's prayer : song / words by Louis Voight ; music by G.S. de Chanéet
 Summer dreams : song / words by Louis Voight ; music by G.S. de Chaneet 
 The children's prayer : song / words by Louis Voight ; music by G.S. de Chaneet 
 The two cities : song / words by Margery Browne ; music by G.S. De Chaneet 
 The rover : song / words by Margery Browne ; music by G.S. de Chaneet 
 The goblin bat : song / words by Margery Browne ; music by G.S. de Chaneet

Recordings
None known

Personal 
His first wife, Johanna Julianna (née Paasch), died in Melbourne in September 1887 in childbirth. De Chanéet then married Martha Matilda Orams (died 1930 in Surabaya) in December the same year. They had a daughter, Myra Matilda (born 1888) and two sons, Victor (born 1895) and Eric George (born 1902). Victor served in the AIF in World War I, winning the Military Medal for bravery in the field in 1918.

De Chaneet had moved to Java before June 1920. He died in Lawang on 2 May 1926, survived by his wife and three children.

References

1861 births
1926 deaths
Australian conductors (music)
Australian male composers
Australian composers
19th-century Australian musicians
19th-century classical composers
Australian male classical composers
Musicians from Victoria (Australia)
People from Melbourne
19th-century male musicians